This is a list of electoral results for the Electoral district of Mount Leonora in Western Australian state elections.

Members for Mount Leonora

Election results

Elections in the 1920s

Elections in the 1910s

 Foley had run for Labor at the 1914 election, and was elected unopposed.

Elections in the 1900s

References

Western Australian state electoral results by district